Sir Robert ("Robin") John Maxwell-Hyslop (6 June 1931 – 13 January 2010) was a British Conservative Party politician.

The younger son of Royal Navy Captain Alexander Henry Maxwell-Hyslop (who adopted the additional name of Maxwell in 1925), AM, who served aboard HMS Devonshire and was recognised for his bravery in averting its loss by explosion in 1929, and was subsequently Captain of HMS Cumberland, and his wife Cecilia Joan (née Bayly), Maxwell-Hyslop was educated at Stowe School and Christ Church, Oxford. He worked for the aero engine division of Rolls-Royce from 1954 to 1960.

He contested the Derby North constituency at the 1959 general election.  When the MP for Tiverton, Derick Heathcoat-Amory, was elevated to the peerage in 1960, Maxwell-Hyslop was elected as his successor at the resulting by-election, and retained the seat until he retired at the 1992 general election. His successor was Angela Browning.

Maxwell-Hyslop was the longest-serving member ever of the Commons Select Committee on Trade and Industry, from 1971 to 1992. (The select committee structure was altered in 1979, with Maxwell-Hyslop continuing to serve on the committee in its new form.) He was also the last Conservative MP to ask Prime Minister Margaret Thatcher a question at PMQ's.

He was knighted in the 1992 New Year Honours. In 1968, he had married Joanna Margaret, daughter of Thomas McCosh, of Pitcon, Dalry, North Ayrshire; they had two daughters.

Maxwell-Hyslop's sister Anthea Peronelle Maxwell-Hyslop is the mother of the fashion designer Serena Bute.

References

Sources
The Times Guide to the House of Commons, Times Newspapers Ltd, 1966, 1987 & 1992

External links 
 

1931 births
2010 deaths
People educated at Stowe School
Alumni of Christ Church, Oxford
Members of the Parliament of the United Kingdom for Tiverton
Conservative Party (UK) MPs for English constituencies
Knights Bachelor
Presidents of the Oxford University Conservative Association
Politicians awarded knighthoods
UK MPs 1959–1964
UK MPs 1964–1966
UK MPs 1966–1970
UK MPs 1970–1974
UK MPs 1974
UK MPs 1974–1979
UK MPs 1979–1983
UK MPs 1983–1987
UK MPs 1987–1992